Roberto Refinetti (born November 19, 1957) is a behavioral physiologist and higher-education administrator. He is best known for his book Circadian Physiology and is ranked in the top 2% of scientists in the world.

Behavioral physiology
Refinetti earned his doctoral degree in psychology from the University of California, Santa Barbara in 1987 and has been a researcher or university professor at the University of Illinois at Urbana-Champaign, the University of Virginia, the College of William and Mary, the University of South Carolina, Boise State University, and the University of New Orleans. He is the editor-in-chief of the interdisciplinary journals Chronobiology International and Sexuality & Culture, as well as section editor of BMC Physiology and editorial board member of the Journal of Thermal Biology, of Biological Rhythm Research, and of Acta Scientiae Veterinariae. He has served as consultant for numerous journalists and media producers on a variety of topics related to biological rhythms, as recorded in newspaper articles on seasonal affective disorder, on daylight-saving time, on the pervasiveness of circadian rhythms, and on myths about lunar cycles in human behavior.

Notable publications
Refinetti is best known as the author of Circadian Physiology, a comprehensive book on circadian rhythms (first edition: 1999; second edition: 2006; third edition: 2016), that has received positive reviews. His research program has been funded by grants from the National Science Foundation and the National Institutes of Health. According to Google Scholar, his four most cited articles are:

Higher education administration
After 20 years in academia administering his own research program as a faculty member and the research programs of others as a journal editor, ad hoc peer reviewer, and review panel member for funding agencies, Refinetti took on the position of academic dean at a satellite campus of the University of South Carolina in 2006. In 2014, he moved to Idaho as the chair of the department of psychology at Boise State University. In 2020, he moved to Louisiana as the chair of the department of psychology at the University of New Orleans.

Awards

Refinetti was named a Distinguished Professor by the South Carolina Commission on Higher Education in 2004, when he was a finalist in the annual process to identify and honor the South Carolina Governor's Professor of the Year. He was awarded a Carolina Trustee Professorship by the Board of Trustees of the University of South Carolina in 2006 because of his record of teaching excellence and of outstanding performance in research and in public service activities. In June 2019, he was elected Fellow of the American Physiological Society for his contributions to the physiological sciences.

References

Brazilian psychologists
21st-century American psychologists
Brazilian physiologists
American physiologists
1957 births
Brazilian emigrants to the United States
Living people
Chronobiologists
University of California, Santa Barbara alumni
20th-century American psychologists